ACM SIGARCH is the Association for Computing Machinery's Special Interest Group on computer architecture, a community of computer professionals and students from academia and industry involved in research and professional practice related to computer architecture and design.  The organization sponsors many prestigious international conferences in this area, including the International Symposium on Computer Architecture (ISCA), recognized as the top conference in this area since 1975. Together with IEEE Computer Society's Technical Committee on Computer Architecture (TCCA), it is one of the two main professional organizations for people working in computer architecture.

ACM SIGARCH was formed in August 1971, initially as a Special Interest Committee (a precursor to a SIG), with Michael J. Flynn as the founding chairman. Flynn was also the founding chairman of IEEE Computer Society's TCCA and encouraged from the beginning, joint cooperation between the two groups. Many of the joint symposiums and conferences are the leading events in the field.

Journal 
ACM SIGARCH Computer Architecture News is a newsletter, started in January 1972, that publishes refereed articles about computer hardware and its interactions with compilers and operating systems.

Conferences 
ACM SIGARCH sponsors many top international conferences related to computer architecture.
 ASPLOS: ACM International Conference on Architectural Support for Programming Languages and Operating Systems
 ANCS: ACM/IEEE Symposium on Architectures for Networking and Communications Systems
 CCGrid: ACM/IEEE International Symposium on Cluster, Cloud and Grid Computing
 HPDC: ACM International Symposium on High-Performance Parallel and Distributed Computing
 ICS:  ACM International Conference on Supercomputing
 IPDPS: IEEE International Parallel and Distributed Processing Symposium
 ISCA: ACM/IEEE International Symposium on Computer Architecture
 NANOCOM: ACM International Conference on Nanoscale Computing and Communication
 NOCS: ACM/IEEE International Symposium on Networks-on-Chip
 PACT: ACM/IEEE International Conference on Parallel Architectures and Compilation
 SenSys: ACM Conference on Embedded Networked Sensor Systems
 SPAA: ACM Symposium on Parallelism in Algorithms and Architectures
 UCC: IEEE/ACM International Conference on Utility and Cloud Computing

Awards 

SIGARCH offers a variety of awards for outstanding contributions to computer architecture:
 Maurice Wilkes Award
 Eckert-Mauchly Award (with IEEE Computer Society)
 ISCA Influential Paper Award (with IEEE-CS TCCA)
 Alan D. Berenbaum Distinguished Service Award
 ASPLOS Influential Paper Award

See also 

 Computer engineering
 Computer science
 Computing

References

External links 
 SIGARCH

Association for Computing Machinery Special Interest Groups